Van Haren and Van Haaren are Dutch toponymic surnames meaning "from/of Ha(a)ren". A haar was the name for a sandy ridge (plural haren) and there are multiple towns named Haren and Haaren in and around the Low Countries. Historical records and the distribution of the surnames suggest that Haren, North Brabant is often at the origin of both forms of the name, while most other Van Haaren families stem from Haaren, North Brabant. People with the surname include:

Van Haren
 (1540–1589), Dutch Geuzen captain and advisor to William the Silent
Arthur Van Haren Jr. (1920–1992), American World War II fighter pilot
Carolina Wilhelmina van Haren (1741–1812), Dutch noble, daughter of Onno Zwier
Elma van Haren (born 1954), Dutch poet
 (1713–1779), Dutch noble statesman and writer
Willem van Haren (1710–1768), Dutch nobleman and poet

Van Haaren
Dirk van Haaren (1878–1953), Dutch painter
Heinz van Haaren (born 1940), Dutch-German football midfielder
John Henry Haaren  (1855–1916), American educator and historian
Marijke van Haaren (born 1952), Dutch CDA politician
Ramon van Haaren (born 1972), Dutch football defender
Ricky van Haaren (born 1991), Dutch football midfielder

See also
Ackermans & van Haaren, Belgian contracting and financial company
Van Haren, a shoe retailer in the Netherlands, see Christian Louboutin#Trademark litigation

References

Dutch-language surnames
Toponymic surnames